Congerville-Thionville is a commune in the Essonne department in Île-de-France in northern France.

Inhabitants of Congerville-Thionville are known as Congervillois-Thionvillois.

Geography

Climate

Congerville-Thionville has a oceanic climate (Köppen climate classification Cfb).

See also
Communes of the Essonne department

References

External links

Mayors of Essonne Association 

Communes of Essonne